Maxwell Joseph Horder (23 March 1923 – 30 April 1965) was an Australian rules footballer who played with Collingwood in the Victorian Football League (VFL).

Notes

External links 
 
 Max Horder, at The VFA Project.
 Profile on Collingwood Forever

1965 deaths
1923 births
Australian rules footballers from Victoria (Australia)
Collingwood Football Club players
Ivanhoe Amateurs Football Club players